The 1893 Amateur Hockey Association of Canada season lasted from January 7 until March 17. The Montreal Hockey Club defeated the Crystals 2-1 to claim the league and Canadian champion for the sixth season in a row and was awarded the new Stanley Cup without any competition by virtue of their status as AHAC champion.

Executive

On December 15, 1892, the AHAC elected its officers for the season:
 President - F. M. S. Jenkins, Ottawa
 1st Vice. Pres. - J. Crathern, Victorias
 2nd Vice. Pres. - A. Laurie, Quebec
 Secretary-Treasurer - J. A. Findlay, Montreal
 Council - A. Ritchie, Crystals; G. Carpenter, Shamrocks; M. Costigan, McGill; A. Z. Palmer, Ottawa Rebels; J. Farwell, Sherbrooke

Season
Ottawa and Quebec got into a dispute. Quebec protested their loss on January 21 in Quebec and refused to play in the return match until the protest was decided. The return match was scheduled for February but was not played until March 17. At the same time, Ottawa was in a dispute with the Ontario Hockey Association over the location of the final match for the Ontario championship. In the end, Ottawa seceded from the Ontario association.

Final standing

Results

† Game awarded to Montreal because Crystals refused to continue.

†† Montreal clinches league championship.

Source: Trail of the Stanley Cup, Vol. 1.

Championship

Montreal HC won the championship for placing first in the regular season. This was Montreal HC's third straight championship since the Championship Trophy was inaugurated in 1891. According to the terms for the trophy, Montreal HC was allowed to keep the Trophy. A new version was struck for following seasons. The version won by Montreal is on display in the collection of the Hockey Hall of Fame.

As champions of the AHAC, the Dominion Hockey Challenge Cup (known today as the Stanley Cup) was to be awarded to Montreal as its inaugural champion. On May 15, 1893, Sheriff John Sweetland finally presented the trophy to the MAAA president J. A. Taylor during the MAAA annual meeting. Each player received a souvenir gold ring as a gift of the MAAA. Disputes between the Montreal HC and the MAAA kept the Cup in the MAAA hands until it was accepted by the Club on February 23, 1894.

Player stats

Goaltending averages

Scoring leaders

Source
Coleman(1966) pp. 9–10

Stanley Cup engraving

1893 Montreal Amateur Athletic Association

See also

 List of pre-NHL seasons
 List of Stanley Cup champions

References

Bibliography

Notes

External links
Composite photo of 1893 hockey game (at McCord Museum website)

Amateur Hockey Association of Canada seasons
AHAC